Pavel Žáček (born 1969) is a Czech academic and politician who served as the first Director of the Institute for the Study of Totalitarian Regimes, the Czech government agency and research institute tasked with investigation of the crimes of the Communist regime of Czechoslovakia that was declared to be criminal in 1993. In 2017, he was elected to the Chamber of Deputies and serves as a Civic Democratic MP.

Education and early career
He holds an M.A. (1992) and a PhD (2001) in Mass Communication from Charles University of Prague. He worked for the Office for the Documentation and the Investigation of the Crimes of Communism from 1993, where he was appointed Deputy Director in 1998. From 1999 to 2006, he was Senior Researcher at the Institute of Contemporary History, Academy of Sciences of the Czech Republic.

Career

He was a member of the Czech Television Council 2001–2003. He is a founding signatory of the Prague Declaration on European Conscience and Communism. In 2010, he was succeeded as Director by Jiří Pernes. He served as adviser to Daniel Herman who was elected director of the Institute in August 2010. After a disputed Herman's removal in April 2013, Pavel Žáček was fired by the new director Pavla Foglová.

A collection of Žáček's papers, including transcripts of interrogations of Czech secret police personnel and documents about Václav Havel, is held in the collection of the Hoover Institution.

References

20th-century Czech historians
Czech civil servants
1969 births
Charles University alumni
Living people
Civic Democratic Party (Czech Republic) MPs
Members of the Chamber of Deputies of the Czech Republic (2017–2021)
Members of the Chamber of Deputies of the Czech Republic (2021–2025)
21st-century Czech historians